Anatol Mühlstein (22 August 1889 – 29 September 1957) was a Polish diplomat and writer. He served as Chargé d'affaires for the Polish embassy in Brussels in 1927, and as Minister Plenipotentiary for the Polish embassy in Paris 1930–36.

Born to a Jewish family in Warsaw, he studied in Geneva, Paris, and Brussels. In 1932, Mühlstein married Diane de Rothschild, daughter of French banker Robert de Rothschild. The couple had three daughters: Nathalie, Anka and Cécile.

After the German invasion of France, Mühlstein moved to the United States. He returned to France after World War II.

References

External links 
 Biography at Internetowy Polski Słownik Biograficzny 

1889 births
1957 deaths
Polish people of Jewish descent
Diplomats of the Second Polish Republic
People associated with the magazine "Kultura"